Teng Zhiqiang (born October 26, 1991 in Gaocun, Mayang, Hunan) is a Chinese male slalom canoeist who competed at the international level from 2005 to 2013.

He won a gold medal in the C1 event at the 2010 Asian Games in Guangzhou. Teng became the first person from Mayang to win gold at the Asian Games, as well as the first person to win a canoe slalom event at the Asian Games. He also won gold in the C1 event at the 2010 Asian Championships in Xiasi and the 2013 National Games in Guangzhou.

At the 2012 Summer Olympics he competed in the C1 event where he finished in 12th place after being eliminated in the semifinals.

Teng was born in Chetou, Gaocun, Mayang. He was a good swimmer in his childhood. In 2002 he joined the Heyuan Water Sports Center where he was coached by Sui Hongjun.

World Cup individual podiums

1 Asian Canoe Slalom Championship counting for World Cup points

References

Chinese male canoeists
1991 births
Living people
People from Huaihua
Sportspeople from Hunan
Olympic canoeists of China
Canoeists at the 2012 Summer Olympics
Asian Games medalists in canoeing
Canoeists at the 2010 Asian Games
Medalists at the 2010 Asian Games
Asian Games gold medalists for China
Canoeists at the 2018 Asian Games